Dagsin is a 2016 Filipino drama film directed by Atom Magadia. It was shortlisted as a potential entry by the Philippines for the Best International Feature Film at the 92nd Academy Awards.

Cast
 Tommy Abuel as Justino
 Lotlot De Leon as Mercy
 Benjamin Alves as Young Justino
 Janine Gutierrez as Young Corazon
 Sue Prado as Grace

References

External links
 

2016 films
2016 drama films
Philippine drama films
Filipino-language films
2010s Tagalog-language films